The September Uprising (Septemvriysko vastanie) was a 1923 communist insurgency in Bulgaria. The Bulgarian Communist Party (BCP) attempted to overthrow Alexander Tsankov's new government established following the coup d'état of 9 June.

See also
Bulgarian coup d'état of 1923
Bulgarian coup d'état of 1934
Bulgarian coup d'état of 1944
St Nedelya Church assault

References

Further reading

 (point of view of Bulgarian Communist Party leaders)

External links
Query of a social democrat deputy in the National Assembly regarding the terror around Lom in September 1923 
Folk song about the massacre of rebels in Gorna Gnoynitsa 
Commentary of data of the German embassy and a conversation with Aleksandar Tsankov 

1923 in Bulgaria
20th-century rebellions
Bulgarian Communist Party
Bulgarian rebellions
Communist rebellions
Conflicts in 1923
Internal Macedonian Revolutionary Organization
Rebellions in Bulgaria
Revolutions of 1917–1923
September 1923 events